Ana Carmen Macri (15 July 1916 – 4 February 2022) was an Argentine politician. She was elected to the Chamber of Deputies in 1951 as one of the first group of female parliamentarians in Argentina.

Biography

Macri was born in Buenos Aires on 15 July 1916. In 1938 she started working at Rivadavia Hospital as a secretary for the radiology department.

One of the founders of the Female Peronist Party, in the 1951 legislative elections she was a Peronist Party candidate in Federal Capital and was one of the 26 women elected to the Chamber of Deputies. She remained in office until 1955, when her term was cut short by the Revolución Libertadora. She was subsequently arrested for treason and jailed in Olmos prison until 1958.

Macri turned 100 in July 2016, and died on 4 February 2022, at the age of 105.

References

1916 births
2022 deaths
People from Buenos Aires
Justicialist Party politicians
Members of the Argentine Chamber of Deputies elected in Buenos Aires
Women members of the Argentine Chamber of Deputies
20th-century Argentine politicians
20th-century Argentine women politicians
Argentine centenarians
Women centenarians